The Zed Islands are a small group of islands, the westernmost rising to , lying  off the northeast extremity of Livingston Island in the South Shetland Islands, Antarctica comprising four islands: Esperanto Island, Phanagoria Island, Lesidren Island and Koshava Island, and the adjacent Dlagnya and Goritsa Rocks.

The name appears to have been applied by Discovery Investigations personnel on the Discovery II who charted the islands in 1935.

Location 

Map 
 L.L. Ivanov. Antarctica: Livingston Island and Greenwich, Robert, Snow and Smith Islands. Scale 1:120000 topographic map.  Troyan: Manfred Wörner Foundation, 2009.

See also 
 Composite Antarctic Gazetteer
 List of Antarctic and sub-Antarctic islands
 List of Antarctic islands south of 60° S
 SCAR
 Territorial claims in Antarctica

References

External links
 SCAR Composite Antarctic Gazetteer.

Islands of the South Shetland Islands